Kenneth Chen Wei-on,  is the current Secretary General of the Secretariat of the Legislative Council of Hong Kong. He was appointed as the Undersecretary for education in 2008.

Education
Chen attended Diocesan Boys' School from 1977 to 1982, and holds a Bachelor of Science degree in electrical engineering and computer science from Princeton University, a Master of Science degree in applied mathematics from Harvard University and an MBA from the Wharton School of the University of Pennsylvania.

Career
He joined the Hong Kong Jockey Club in 2000 and was its director of Racecourse Business when he left.   He served as a part-time member of the Central Policy Unit between 1998 and 2000 and a Member of the Advisory Committee on Teacher Education and Qualifications between 2002 and 2008.

Undersecretary
In 2008, he was nominated Undersecretary for the Education Bureau under the Political Appointments System. He chaired a working group to study the development of e-learning resources in Hong Kong.  A report was published in October 2009.

Secretary General
In 2019, he was criticised by the pan-democrats for exceeding his powers. On behalf of the Secretariat, he issued a circular to members of the bills committee on Saturday requesting them to vote on whether to replace James To with Abraham Razack as the presiding officer of the committee in question. The pan-democrats believed that he did not follow the convention of allowing members to discuss the matter first. An online petition gathered over 20,000 signatures calling for his resignation.

Personal life

References

Government officials of Hong Kong
Princeton University School of Engineering and Applied Science alumni
Harvard University alumni
Wharton School of the University of Pennsylvania alumni
Living people
Recipients of the Silver Bauhinia Star
1965 births